United States of North America may refer to:

 A term used before 11 July 1778 to refer to the United States of America
 Maurice Gomberg's 1942 Outline of the Post-War New World Map, with a United States of America.  This map was deposited with the Library of Congress of the United States of America by Maurice Gomberg of Philadelphia in 1942.
 A fictional country including the United States of America and Canada in the 1966 novel Colossus (novel)
 A fictional country including the United States of America and Canada in the 1985 computer game A Mind Forever Voyaging
 Several fictional alternate history countries often including the United States of America and Canada, and often including Mexico, Greenland, Cuba, and other nearby countries.
 A fictional country in the 2014 anime series The Irregular at Magic High School.

See also
 The United North American States is a fictional Earth country part of the Systems Alliance in the video game series Mass Effect
 The North American Union